The Cohens and the Kellys in Paris is a 1928 American comedy film directed by William Beaudine. It was the first sequel to The Cohens and Kellys. The film title is sometimes listed as The Cohens and Kellys in Paris.

It was an early production of Edward Small.

Cast
George Sidney as Sidney Cohen
J. Farrell MacDonald as Patrick Kelly
Vera Gordon as Mrs. Cohen
Kate Price as Mrs. Kelly
Charles Delaney as Patrick Kelly Jr.
Sue Carol as Sadye Cohen
Gertrude Astor as Paulette
Gino Corrado as Pierre
Charles Murray (Undetermined Secondary Role)

Preservation status
The film is preserved in the Library of Congress collection Packard Campus for Audio-Visual Conservation and the Cineteca Nazionale, Rome.

See also
Gertrude Astor filmography

References

External links
 
 

Film stills at BFI.org.uk

1928 films
American silent feature films
1928 comedy films
Films directed by William Beaudine
Silent American comedy films
Films set in Paris
Universal Pictures films
Paris
American black-and-white films
Films produced by Edward Small
1920s American films